John Allen (born 23 June 1950) is a British biochemist. He is an honorary professor at the  Department of Genetics, Evolution and Environment at the University College London in the United Kingdom.

Background and education

Allen attended Lliswerry Primary School, Newport and Hartridge High School, Newport, Monmouthshire, Wales. He obtained a BSc from King's College London in 1972 from the School of Biological Sciences. He subsequently obtained a PhD from King's College as well. From 1975-1977, Allen was a Science and Engineering Research Council (SERC) postdoctoral research fellow at the Botany School of the University of Oxford. During his position as postdoctoral research assistant at the Department of Biological Sciences, University of Warwick in the UK (1979-1983), he was also a visiting research associate at the University of Illinois at Urbana–Champaign in the US (1980). In 1983 he took up a lectureship in the Department of Pure and Applied Biology at the University of Leeds. He returned to the US from 1986-1987 as a Nuffield Foundation Science Research Fellow at the Lawrence Berkeley Laboratory at the University of California in Berkeley, California. In 1990 he became Professor of Plant Physiology at the University of Oslo, Norway. He moved in 1992 to Sweden where he became the first professor in Plant Cell Biology at Lund University. He stayed in Lund until 2005 when he became Professor of Biochemistry at Queen Mary University of London. He was honoured with a Royal Society-Wolfson Research Merit Award (2005-2009). In 2015, he became honorary professor at University College London.

Contributions to science 
Allen is a plant biochemist, in particular relating to regulation of photosynthesis. His work has been cited over 12,000 times. He has given over 300 seminars in 22 countries and 4 continents. 19 of these were plenary or named lectures. Professor Allen's name is linked to the CoRR hypothesis which he formulated in 1993 in the Journal of Theoretical Biology, introducing the term “CoRR" in 2003. Briefly, the CoRR hypothesis states that endosymbiotic organelles such as mitochondria and chloroplasts retain genomes to provide for regulation of gene expression by electron transport and the redox state of the organelle.

In addition, Allen works on mitochondrial ageing in relation to sex.

Honours and awards 

Allen has been granted the following honours and awards:

2015-2017, Leverhulme Emeritus Research Fellow 
2012-2013, Visiting Professor, Genetics, Evolution and Environment, University College London
2009–present, Fellow of the Linnean Society of London
2009-2010, Fellow of the Institute of Biology
2008, Rudi Lemberg Travelling Fellowship of the Australian Academy of Science
2007, William Evans Fellow at the University of Otago, New Zealand
1993–present, Member of the Royal Physiographic Society of Lund

Selected highly cited publications

References

External links
For a lecture by Professor Allen at the Royal Society on the CoRR hypothesis see Why are there two sexes?
commentary by Daniella Venton, Highlight: On the Origin of the Sexes.

1950 births
Living people
Alumni of King's College London
British biochemists
Fellows of the Linnean Society of London